Noranco is a village and former municipality in the district of Lugano in the canton of Ticino, Switzerland.

The village, formerly a municipality of its own, was merged with neighboring Pambio in 1904 to constitute a new municipality Pambio-Noranco. In 2004, Pambio-Noranco municipality was incorporated into the larger, neighboring municipality Lugano and now forms a quarter of that city.

Former municipalities of Ticino
Villages in Ticino
Lugano